The Maui Interscholastic League or MIL consists of 13 high schools that sponsor a number of athletic sports, including football, basketball, volleyball and soccer. Moloka'i High School and Lanai High School are voluntary members of the MIL due to the lack of other major high schools on the island of Moloka'i and Lanai. The War Memorial Stadium is used for the league's football games.

Member institutions

Sports 
The MIL fall and winter season sports include air riflery, basketball, bowling, cheerleading, cross-country, football, canoeing, soccer, girl's volleyball, swimming and diving, wrestling, and junior varsity softball.

References

External links 

 Maui Interscholastic League homepage

Hawaii high school athletic conferences
Sports in Maui